Ray Mead (12 April 1913 – 17 May 2001) was an  Australian rules footballer who played with North Melbourne in the Victorian Football League (VFL).

Notes

External links 

1913 births
2001 deaths
Australian rules footballers from Victoria (Australia)
North Melbourne Football Club players